Lahunipara Degree College is private post secondary institution located in the Lahunipara tehsil in Bonaigarh, India.

See also 
 Government Autonomous College, Rourkela
 Municipal College, Rourkela

References

External links 
 https://entranceindia.com/college-in-odisha-3/lahunipara-degree-college-lahunipara-sundargarh/
 http://www.punjabcolleges.com/70604-indiacolleges-Lahunipara-Degree-College-Lahunipara/
 http://wapwon.live/category/lahunipara-group-dance-song.html
 http://www.govtcollegesundargarh.org/
 https://careerurl.com/institutes/lahunipara-collegelahunipara

Colleges in India
Odisha